Soobrazitelny is the second ship of the  (officially known as Project 20380) built for the Russian Navy in the early 21st century.

Description 
The ship is the first of the class to be fitted with the Redut system intended to increase its anti-aircraft capabilities with respect to the Kashtan CIWS previously used.

Construction and service 
Soobrazitelny was laid down at the Severnaya Verf shipyard in Saint Petersburg on 20 May 2003. She was launched in late March 2010 and was shown to the public for the first time at the fifth International Maritime Defence Show (IMDS-2011) in St. Petersburg. The corvette began state testing in July 2011 and joined the Baltic Fleet on 14 October of that year, when her acceptance certificate was signed. Soobrazitelny was designated Guards on 1 March 2012 and received a battle flag inherited from her predecessors with the same name on 29 July of that year.

In April 2017, Soobrazitelny and her sister Boyky were escorted through the English Channel by HMS Sutherland.

Soobrazitelny and Stoikiy entered the Mediterranean in October 2022. Between 18–21 October, they visited Algeria. In late November, both corvettes were absent from Tartus, likely shadowing French aircraft carrier, deployed to the East Mediterranean. On 5 December, they were in Tartus.

The ship was one of the main characters shown in the RT channel documentary series "The Baltic Fleet".

References

Steregushchiy-class corvettes
Naval ships of Russia
2010 ships
Ships built at Severnaya Verf